Nazareth is a settlement on the eastern side of Saint Thomas in the United States Virgin Islands.

Ivanna Eudora Kean High School, formerly known as Nazareth Bay, is located in Nazareth.

References

Populated places in Saint Thomas, U.S. Virgin Islands
East End, Saint Thomas, U.S. Virgin Islands